The Bolivian National Road network (Spanish: Rutas Nacionales) comprises 16,029 km (as of 2006) of roadway across all of Bolivia.

The National Road network was established with the Decreto Supremo 25.134 of 21 August 1998, with a length of 10,401 kilometres, consisting of 17 national roads. Today, there are 45 national roads in total. Route 16 still does not exist continuously, as such measurements of its length are estimated.

Bolivia's National Road network is 28% (4,514 km) paved, 40% (6,455 km) gravel, and 32% (5,060 km) compacted and beaten earth.

Since the climate, especially in the Bolivian lowlands, is characterized by extended rainy seasons, this situation repeatedly leads to poor traffic conditions, making mudslides, road traffic collisions, and fatalities commonplace.

List of routes 

|}

References 

Roads in Bolivia